FRM may refer to:

 Financial Risk Manager
 Fixed-rate mortgage
 Category of frames
 Fairmont Municipal Airport (Minnesota), in the United States
 Fareham railway station, in England
 Fathers' rights movement
 Frankfurt Rhine-Main, Germany
 FRM II, a research reactor in Munich
 Front Row Motorsports
 Middle French
 National Technological University – Mendoza Regional Faculty, in Argentina